Katihar is a city situated in the eastern part of the state of Bihar  in India. It is the regional headquarter of Katihar district. It is one of the important cities of Bihar. Also it's a main route of Delhi - Guwahati railway line.

History
Katihar is a part of the Mithila region. Mithila first gained prominence after being settled by Indo-Aryan peoples who established the Mithila Kingdom (also called Kingdom of the Videhas).

During the late Vedic period (c. 1100–500 BCE), Kingdom of the Videhas became one of the major political and cultural centers of South Asia, along with Kuru and Pañcāla. The kings of the Kingdom of the Videhas were called Janakas. The Mithila Kingdom was later incorporated into the Vajjika League, which had its capital in the city of Vaishali, which is also in Mithila. Later it was dominated by Chaudhary family who were the biggest landlord of kosi commisionery and holds approx 15000 acre land in katihar district and 8500 acre in Purnia district.
The founder of Chaudhary family was Taj Ali Chaudhary and his four sons Chaudhary khuda baksh , Chaudhary Qadir baksh ,Khan Bahadur Chaudhary Mohammad baksh and Elahi baksh.

Transport

Road
Katihar is connected through road network to the neighbouring cities of Bihar. Interstate bus services are not available. A highway , however, connects it to Purnia, from where ,  and  passes through or starts through.

Air
The nearest airport is located at Purnia Airport near Purnea (30 km), but it is a airforce station.
The nearest commercial airport is located at Bagdogra Airport (160 km) near Siliguri (West Bengal). However, recently the government has announced to open an air force base airport in Chunapur, Purnea to be allowed to use for commercial use. However, it is not operational yet.

Rail
Katihar Junction is a major strategic Railway Junction under Northeast Frontier Railways which connects North East India with the rest of India.

Education

Katihar has many education institutions, including:

 The Boffo School
 Colonels Academy
 International School of East India
 Jawahar Navodaya Vidyalaya, Katihar
 Katihar Ramakrishna Mission Vidyamandir (estd. in 1951; it used to be under WBBSE; now affiliated with CBSE)
 Kendriya Vidyalaya, Katihar
 Manipal public school
 SBP Vidya Vihar
 Scottish Public School, Katihar

Government colleges

 D.S. College, Katihar
 Govt. Polytechnic, Katihar
 K.B Jha College, Katihar
 M J M Mahila College
 Sita Ram Chamaria College

Other important institutes
 Katihar Medical College and Hospital (KMCH), a private medical college in Katihar City suburbs, recognized by the Medical Council of India (MCI),
 Purnea University
 Suryadeo Law College, Katihar

 Maharshi Menhi Homoeopathic Medical College & Hospital, Katihar

Demographics

As per the 2011 census, Katihar Urban Agglomeration had a population of 240,565. Katihar Urban Agglomeration includes Katihar (municipal corporation plus outgrowth) and Katihar Railway Colony (outgrowth). Katihar Municipal Corporation had a total population of 225,982, out of which 119,142 were males and 106,840 were females. It had a sex ratio of 897. The population below 5 years was 31,036. The literacy rate of the 7+ population was 79.87 per cent. Katihar is at 193rd rank in terms of its population among the top 200 cities of India as per the 2011 census.

Religion 
Hinduism is major religion in Katihar city with 185.196 Hindus (76.9%), 53.213 Muslims (22.1%). Other religions includes 794 Christians (0.33%), 373 Sikhs (0.15%), 221 Jains (0.09%), 70 Buddhists (0.03%) and 960 (0.4%) did not stated.

Climate

The climate of Katihar is nearly moderate with widespread rainfall during the monsoons sometimes bringing flood to the adjoining rural areas of the Katihar District.

See also
 List of cities in Bihar
 Kolasi
 Korha
 Tingachhia

References

External links

 katihar.bih.nic.in
District Court, Katihar

 
Cities and towns in Katihar district